is a professional Japanese baseball player. He is an outfielder for the Yokohama DeNA Bay Stars of Nippon Professional Baseball (NPB).

References 

1995 births
Living people
Nippon Professional Baseball outfielders
Baseball people from Osaka Prefecture
Yokohama DeNA BayStars players